This is a list of lighthouses in Pakistan.

List

Gallery

See also
 Lists of lighthouses and lightvessels

References

External links

 

Pakistan
Lighthouses
Lighthouses